Campbell Hall can refer to:

 Campbell Hall (UC Berkeley), an academic building
 Campbell Hall School in North Hollywood, California
 A hamlet in the town of Hamptonburgh, New York
 Campbell Hall (Metro-North station), in the hamlet
 A residence hall at Virginia Tech
 A residence hall at Rutgers University
 A residence hall at Mount Allison University
 A residence hall at University of Northern Iowa

Architectural disambiguation pages